Hate Lives in a Small Town is the seventh studio album by Cuban American dark cabaret singer Voltaire, released on September 3, 2010. In it, Voltaire abandons his characteristic dark cabaret sonority and heads towards a country direction. He originally wanted to record it as a solo acoustic album, but later realized that something was missing, and ended up using a full band.

In his official website, Voltaire explains why he decided to make a country album:[I] had spent [my] adult life saying [I] disliked country music. That is, until one day when in a karaoke bar [I was] reacquainted with a Johnny Cash song called "Folsom Prison Blues". "I LOVE that song", [I] exclaimed. It was followed by a Hank Williams song, a Merle Haggard song, songs by Kenny Rogers, Willie Nelson, Buck Owens and more. It was then that I realized that I didn't hate country music after all. I hated what it had become. In my somewhat drunken state, I thought: "Wouldn't it be interesting to make a record of old-school country music, the kind of record that could have been released 40 years ago?".

This would be the first album by Voltaire featuring drummer Brian Viglione.

Track listing

Personnel
 Voltaire — vocals, acoustic guitar
 Frank Morin — guitars on "When You're Dead" and "The Churchyard"
 Smith Curry — dobro, banjo, pedal steel guitar
 Ken Zwerin — bass, upright bass
 Brian Viglione — drums
 Glenn Sorino — drums

References

2010 albums
Gothic country albums
Voltaire (musician) albums